Pedro Fernández de Castro y Andrade (1576–1622), better known as the Great Count of Lemos, was a Galician (Spanish) nobleman who was viceroy of Naples from 1608, and was also president of the Council of the Indies.

Biography
A member of the House of Castro, he was born at Monforte de Lemos.

King Philip III of Spain named him president of the Council of the Indies in 1603. In 1608 he was appointed Viceroy of Naples.  During his tenure in southern Italy, he ordered the reconstruction of the University of Royal Studies in Naples, and commissioned the reclamation of lands of the Volturno plain in the Terra di Lavoro.

He was the patron of writers such as Miguel de Cervantes, Lope de Vega, Francisco de Quevedo, the Argensola brothers and others.

He died in Madrid in 1622.

External links 

1576 births
1622 deaths
People from Monforte de Lemos
Pedro
Viceroys of Naples
Spanish people in Spanish controlled parts of Italy